Watertown International Airport  is in the Town of Hounsfield in Jefferson County, New York, United States,  west of Watertown. The airport is used for general aviation, but has scheduled passenger service subsidized by the Essential Air Service program. The airport has no scheduled international passenger flights, but is available as an international port of entry for private aircraft on two hours' advance notice from pilots.

The Federal Aviation Administration says this airport had 2,203 passenger boardings (enplanements) in calendar year 2010, 4,449 in 2011, and 16,988 in 2012. It is included in the Federal Aviation Administration (FAA) National Plan of Integrated Airport Systems for 2023–2027, in which it is categorized as a non-hub primary commercial service facility.

History 
The city of Watertown bought the land in 1927 and the Airport was opened in 1929.

Facilities

It has two asphalt runways:

Runway 10/28 is 
Runway 7/25 is 

The airport has an instrument landing system and a medium-intensity approach lighting system with runway alignment indicator lights on the shorter runway 7.

In the 12-month period ending June 30, 2022, the airport had 49,786 aircraft operations, average 136 per day: 66% general aviation, 29% military, 3% airline, and 2% air taxi. In December 2022, 35 aircraft were based at this airport: 24 single-engine, 8 multi-engine, 1 jet, and 2 helicopter.

Airport development
Watertown International Airport's first scheduled jet service is operated by American Eagle Airlines, which flies 44 passenger Embraer ERJ 145 regional jets. Service was initially planned to begin in June 2011, however an environmental impact assessment had to first be completed to ensure that neither residents of nearby Dexter nor others has the new service. Additionally, renovation work of baggage systems and passenger waiting areas was necessary to accommodate the new service, which cost nearly one million dollars. Service began November 17, 2011.

Airline and destination

The following airline offers scheduled passenger service:

Statistics

References

Other sources

 Essential Air Service documents (Docket OST-1997-2842) from the U.S. Department of Transportation:
 Order 2005-5-8 (May 18, 2005): re-selecting Mesa Air Group, Inc., d/b/a Air Midwest, to continue providing essential air service (EAS) at Massena, Ogdensburg and Watertown, New York, for a two-year period, and establishes an annual subsidy of $1,757,834 for service consisting of three round trips each weekday and three over the weekend period between the communities and Pittsburgh, with 19-seat Beech 1900D aircraft.
 Order 2006-12-22 (December 22, 2006): selecting Big Sky Transportation Co., a wholly owned subsidiary of MAIR Holdings, Inc. d/b/a Big Sky Airlines, to provide essential air service (EAS) at Massena, Ogdensburg, and Watertown, New York, consisting of 18 weekly round trips, three each weekday and three each weekend, to Boston, with 19-seat Beech 1900D turboprop aircraft for the two-year period beginning on or about March 1, 2007, at a combined annual subsidy of $2,097,906.
 Order 2008-3-15 (March 14, 2008): selecting Hyannis Air Service, Inc. d/b/a Cape Air, to provide subsidized essential air service (EAS) at Massena, Ogdensburg, and Watertown, New York, for the two-year period beginning when the carrier inaugurates full EAS pursuant to this Order, at a total annual subsidy of $3,879,863.
 Order 2011-3-34 (March 29, 2011): selecting American Eagle Airlines, a wholly owned subsidiary of AMR Corporation to provide essential air service (EAS) at Watertown, New York, using 44-seat Embraer ERJ 140 aircraft for a two-year period beginning when it inaugurates full EAS, through the end of the 24th month thereafter, for an annual subsidy of $3,047,972.
 Order 2013-10-8 (October 21, 2013): tentatively reselects American Airlines, at Watertown, New York. Watertown, New York: Docket 1997-2842; Effective Period: December 1, 2013, through January 31, 2016; Service: Twelve (12) nonstop round trips per week to Chicago O'Hare (ORD); Aircraft Type: Embraer-140 Regional Jet; Annual Subsidy: $3,356,349.
 Order 2013-11-1 (November 1, 2013): making final the tentative selection of American Airlines at Watertown, New York, as described in Order 2013-10-8.
 Essential Air Service documents (Docket OST-2013-0188) from the U.S. Department of Transportation:
 Order 2014-4-25 (April 22, 2014): approving the request of American Airlines Group, Inc. to change its service pattern at Watertown, New York, from Chicago O'Hare International Airport to Philadelphia International Airport effective May 8, 2014. American will operate this route with increased frequency (14 weekly nonstop round trips) at no increase in annual subsidy. American will provide the service with 50-passenger Canadair CRJ200 aircraft from mid-May to mid-September, and 37-passenger DH8-100 aircraft the remaining time. Because we are simply allowing the alternate service pattern and not requiring it, American may revert to the original service pattern at any time.

External links
 Watertown International Airport, official website
  from New York State DOT
 Aerial image as of May 1994 from USGS The National Map
 
 

Airports in New York (state)
Essential Air Service
Transportation buildings and structures in Jefferson County, New York
Buildings and structures in Watertown, New York